Fosi Pala'amo (born 23 August 1976) is a New Zealand professional rugby player of Samoan descent. Internationally, he plays for Samoa. He was born in Murupara, New Zealand to Samoan parents. He was formerly a player for the Irish team Leinster Rugby, but now works at Pfizer for a living and coaches the forwards on the Pfizer tag rugby team. Pala'amo coaches Monkstown u20s.

Professional profile
Pala'amo is a product of the famous Australian rugby club Randwick, where he was selected for the Australian Under 21 team, playing alongside Wallabies such as Tom Bowman and Stirling Mortlock. However, despite being hailed a Wallaby in the making, he switched his allegiance to Samoa, and in 1998 at the age of 21, he made his debut for Samoa in the Oceania qualifying games for the 1999 world cup. However, he withdrew from the Samoa squad for the 1999 Rugby World Cup due to a serious knee injury which threatened to end his playing career. Pala'amo did not play international rugby again for eight years. He was eventually recalled to the squad for the 2007 World Cup, despite not participating in the warm up games. He was thrown in at the deep end against the defending champions and eventual runners-up, England. In total, Pala'amo has nine international caps for Samoa. He now works for Pfizer Ireland and lives in Dublin. He is the son of a Samoan church minister who has retired in Australia.

References

1976 births
Living people
Samoa international rugby union players
People from Murupara
New Zealand sportspeople of Samoan descent
New Zealand rugby union coaches
New Zealand rugby union players
New Zealand expatriate rugby union players
Expatriate rugby union players in Ireland
Expatriate rugby union players in England
New Zealand expatriate sportspeople in England
New Zealand expatriate sportspeople in Ireland
Rugby union players from the Bay of Plenty Region